Elko Speedway, is a 3/8 mile asphalt oval NASCAR-sanctioned race track located in Elko New Market, Minnesota. Elko Speedway is a track in the NASCAR Advance Auto Parts Weekly Series. The track is located in the former Elko portion of the merged city.

Divisions
The track divisions include Limited Late Models, Thunder Car, Legends, Power Stocks, and Bandoleros on regular Saturday Nights.

Traveling series

The ASA held races at the track, and its successor the ARCA Midwest Tour still holds events. The track has held Mid-American Stock Car Series events as well as their now-defunct Super Truck division.

The ARCA racing series held the Akona 200, their first ever race in Minnesota, at Elko Speedway on June 2, 2012. The series returned in 2013 and 2014 for the Akona 250, adding 50 laps to the event.  Elko is the shortest track ARCA currently races on.

Eve of Destruction
Elko Speedway commonly hosts an event called "Eve of Destruction" which would have traditional racing, as well as events such as using a Jet Truck to melt a car, Burn Out competitions, School Bus Figure-8 Racing, and Trailer racing. all with the intent of showing cars being damaged or on fire.

Drive in Movie Theater
Elko Speedway has a Drive-in theater in which films are shown, most commonly after races.

See also
2007 Elko 125
2008 Kwik Trip 125
2009 Elko 125 (Spring)

References

Motorsport venues in Minnesota
Buildings and structures in Scott County, Minnesota
Tourist attractions in Scott County, Minnesota
ARCA Menards Series tracks
NASCAR tracks
1965 establishments in Minnesota
Sports venues completed in 1965